The United Arab Emirates Air Force (UAEAF)  is the air force of the United Arab Emirates (UAE), part of the United Arab Emirates Armed Forces. Its predecessor was established in 1968, when the Emirates were still under British rule. Since then, it has undergone a continual reorganisation and expansion in terms of both capability and numbers of aircraft. Currently, the UAEAF has around 4,000 personnel and operates approximately 552 fixed wing and rotorcraft.

History
The UAEAF's history starts in May 1968, with the formation of an Air Wing of the Abu Dhabi Defence Force (ADDF) under British rule. Its key roles being to provide both a transport service and a ground attack support capability for ADDF land forces. Major investment in the early 1970s assured an expansion in terms of capabilities, quality and quantity of aircraft. It also led to the renaming of the Air Wing to the ADDF Air Force in 1972. Training and instruction was provided by the Pakistan Air Force. During the 1973 Arab-Israel War (6-25 October 1973), the ADDF Air Force's Caribous served as air ambulances in Jordan.

The Emirate of Dubai maintained its own air component, the Dubai Defence Force Air Wing, until 1999, when the two were effectively merged to become what is now the United Arab Emirates Air Force. Although the integration of the two independent forces has been complete, a small degree of autonomy exists at the operational command level, with the Western Air Command being headquartered in Abu Dhabi and the Central Air Command in Dubai.

Since the 1980s, a combination of regional instability and high oil prices has resulted in an ambitious modernisation of the UAEAF, with the goal of attaining a level of capability matching the highest NATO standards.

In the 1991 Gulf War, the UAE helped other countries by carrying out airstrikes against Iraqi forces.

In 2014, the UAE Air Force along with the Egyptian Air Force carried out airstrikes in Libya against Islamist factions in Tripoli.

In September 2014, UAE Air Force aircraft joined in US-led air strikes against terrorist targets in Syria and Iraq that later became known as Operation Inherent Resolve. These operations were suspended after a Jordanian pilot was captured by Islamic State militants in late December 2014; pending improvements in US search and rescue capabilities in the region.

In 2015, UAE Air Force dropped bombs on ISIS targets in Syria. One of them was Major Mariyam Al Mansouri, the first female UAE Air Force pilot.

The UAE military is also part of the Saudi Arabian-led intervention in Yemen.

Personnel and training

The UAEAF consists of about 4,000 personnel.

In the 1970s and 80s, the UAEAF was instructed by Pakistan Air Force pilots on Dassault Mirage 5s, the backbone of the UAEAF at the time. Even today, many of the personnel are ex-Pakistan Air Force officers and technicians. Most of the flying instructors at Al Ain are from Pakistan, training pilots using Grob G 115, Pilatus PC-7, Aermacchi MB-339, and BAE Hawk 63 aircraft. A few officers of No. 12 Squadron (Hawk 102) at Al Minhad Air Base, are also from the Pakistan Air Force. Some of these officers are on deputation (active service), but most are on civilian contracts with the Air Force Headquarters in Abu Dhabi. Numerous officers of other nationalities have also trained UAE pilots, among them Pakistanis, Moroccans, Canadians, Jordanians, and South Africans.

Women have started training as pilots. The first batch consisted of engineers given approval for flight training. So far, only three women have become actual fighter pilots and one a transport pilot. One woman pilot was grounded due to an ejection from a training flight in a Hawk 63. Instructors at Al Dhafra Air Base are now mainly from the US, as the UAEAF has retired its Mirage 5s in favour of F-16s.

Currently there are five main air bases operational, split between the Western and Central Air Command. The Joint Aviation Command has its own airbase and operates a wide range of helicopters.

Candidates apply to the Khalifa bin Zayed Air College, which is located at the Al Ain International Airport in Al Ain. They first go through a rigorous schedule of academics (Basic Level: Military Sciences), fitness and officer training. Those who are selected as cadets then start the second phase of academics: Flight Sciences (Aeronautical Science). Cadets who pass the assessment period of the second phase are designated aviation cadets and start flight training. The first aircraft cadets get to fly is the Grob G115 TA. Those who qualify then go on to fly the Pilatus PC-7. On this aircraft, they learn the basics of flying, take-off and landing techniques and procedures followed by a bit of aerobatics. Following the Primary Flying Course is the Basic Flight Course, piloting the Hawk 63. Graduates are graded and assigned accordingly to one of three options: the Advanced Strike course at Minhad on the Hawk 102 aircraft, transport aircraft, and helicopters. At Minhad, the new pilots learn Basic Fighters Manoeuvres, drop bombs and learn to fly cross-country to a neighbouring country, commonly Bahrain or Kuwait. Upon completion of the Advanced Strike course, officers are selected either for the F-16 (Block 60) or the Dassault Mirage 2000-9, both at Al Dhafra AB. A few pilots are selected to learn to fly the F-16 with the United States Air Force's 162d Fighter Wing in Tucson, Arizona.

Overview

2007 marked the culmination of the largest procurement programmes ever undertaken by the UAE Air Force, with the final deliveries of the 80 F-16E/F Block 60 "Desert Falcons" and approximately 60 upgraded Mirage 2000-9, giving the air force a considerable multirole capability. These two investments represented a total expenditure of around $10 billion, with additional money spent on infrastructure and logistics. A $6.4 billion contract with Lockheed Martin for the supply and support of the 80 F-16s was signed in March 2000, while a $3.4 billion deal for the purchase of 30 new Mirage 2000-9 and retrofitting of the 33 older UAE Mirage 2000s was signed earlier in 1998. Missiles were also purchased: 160 AGM-88 HARMs, 1,000 or more AGM-65 Mavericks, about 500 AIM-120 AMRAAMs, 270 AIM-9 Sidewinders and 52 AGM-84 Harpoons. In November 2017, the United Arab Emirates Armed Forces announced their intention to sign a contract with Dassault Aviation for the upgrade of its Mirage 2000-9 aircraft. French newspaper La Tribune reported the modernization would cost roughly €300 million.

After a competition between the BAE Hawk, KAI T-50 Golden Eagle and Alenia Aermacchi M-346 Master, the UAEAF announced the acquisition of 48 trainer and light attack aircraft, with the first deliveries to take place in 2012. The other training types that are thought to be near replacement are the 30 Pilatus PC-7s and five Aermacchi MB-339s serving with the Air Academy at Al Ain.  The MB-339 is also in use with the UAEAF flight display team, Al Fursan.

The UAEAF has operated 20 IAR 330 Puma helicopters since the late 1970s. These have been recently upgraded to the IAR-330SM standard by IAR Ghimbav in Romania in cooperation with Eurocopter. These aircraft, supplemented by a further ten ex-South African Air Force reworked SA-330s, are expected to remain in service for at least 15 years. Although no replacement for the Puma fleet is required in the immediate future, the force will be supplemented by 26 Sikorsky UH-60M Battlehawks, with 390 AGM-114N Hellfire II missiles. 30 AH-64A Apache helicopters were modernised as well, to the AH-64D Longbow standard, and a dozen Eurocopter Fennecs were recently acquired for special forces use.

The most important facility of the UAEAF is the Al Dhafra Air Base, with almost the entire fighter aircraft fleet located there. However, in order to prevent all of the air defence and strike assets being located at a single base, a $1 billion, completely new facility has been constructed deep in the Abu Dhabi desert, near the border corner with Saudi Arabia and Oman, near Al Gharbia, housing at least one Mirage 2000 unit. Al-Safran is believed to have opened between around 2008. It is 3,000 m long and has aircraft parking nearly the same size as in Al Udeid Air Base, Qatar. A 4,000 m runway at Al-Safran Air Base was built around 2008.

Structure
As of 2008, the structure of the United Arab Emirates Air Force is as follows:

Western Air Command - HQ at Abu Dhabi
Fighter Wing - Al Dhafra Air Base
1st Shaheen Squadron - F-16E/F Block 60 Desert Falcon
2nd Shaheen Squadron - F-16E/F Desert Falcon
3rd Shaheen Squadron - F-16E/F Desert Falcon
71st Fighter Squadron - Mirage 2000-9EAD/DAD
76th Fighter Squadron - Mirage 2000-9EAD/DAD
86th Fighter Squadron - Mirage 2000-9EAD/DAD (Al Safran Air Base)

Transport Wing - Al Bateen Air Base
C-130 Squadron - C-130H Hercules
CASA Squadron - CN-235M-110
Puma Squadron - IAR-330SM Puma
6th Squadron - AB.412HP/SP, Bell-214B
Naval Squadron - AS.332B/M Super Puma, AS.565SB Panther

Central Air Command - HQ at Dubai
Al Minhad Air Base (helicopter base)
102nd CAS Squadron - BAE Hawk Mk.102
Transport Squadron - C-130H-30, L-100-30 Hercules
Special electronic missions Squadron Saab 340 AEW&C
Air-to-air refueling Squadron Airbus A330 MRTT
Dubai International Airport (transport aircraft)

Joint Aviation Command (JAC) - HQ at Abu Dhabi 
Group 10 (Assault) - Al Dhafra Air Base 
AH-64D Apache

Group 18 (Special Operations) - Sas Al Nakheel Air Base
UH-60M, CH-47F
Group 21 (Navy) - Sas Al Nakheel Air Base
AS332B1, AS332M1, AS565MB, AS565SB
Group 22 (COIN and Reconnaissance) - Al Ain/Camp Hazza
Cessna 208B, DHC-6-300, DHC-6-400, Thrush S2R-T660
Group 23 (Observation, Training) - Sas Al Nakheel Air Base
AS550C3
Group 25 (Assault)- Sas Al Nakheel Air Base 
CH-47F
Group 26 (Assault) - Al Minhad Air Base, Sas Al Nakheel Air Base
UH-60L
UH-60M
Group 28 (Observation and Reconnaissance) - Al Ain/Camp Hazza
Bell407GX

Commanders
Mohamed bin Zayed Al Nahyan
Mohamed Al Qamzi
Ibrahim Nasser Mohammed Al Alawi

Equipment

Aircraft

Joint Air Command

Retired 
Previous aircraft operated by the Air Force were the Dassault Mirage 5, Boeing 707, Aeritalia G.222, CASA C-212, SF.260T, Alouette III, SA 342 Gazelle, Bölkow Bo 105, Bell 206 & Bell 214 helicopter.

Future equipment 
Future programs include the Next-Generation Fighter, request for proposals has been sent to Boeing F/A-18 Super Hornet, Dassault Rafale, Eurofighter Typhoon, Lockheed Martin F-35A Lightning II and Sukhoi Su-57.

On 3 December 2021 it was announced that the UAE had signed an order for 80 Rafale F4s.

See also
United Arab Emirates Armed Forces
Khalifa bin Zayed Air College

Further reading 

 The Evolution of the Armed Forces of the United Arab Emirates by Athol Yates

References
Yates, Athol (2020). The Evolution of the Armed Forces of the United Arab Emirates. Warwick: Helion & Company. 
"Force Report: UAE Air Force & Air Defence", AirForces Monthly magazine, January 2008 issue.

External links
UAE Air Force Order of Battle
The Evolution of the Armed Forces of the United Arab Emirates by Athol Yates

 
1968 establishments in the Trucial States
Military units and formations established in 1968